Central Illinois Regional Airport at Bloomington-Normal  is a public airport in McLean County, Illinois, three miles east of Bloomington and southeast of Normal. Owned by the Bloomington-Normal Airport Authority, it is also known as Central Illinois Regional Airport (CIRA).

The National Plan of Integrated Airport Systems for 2011–2015 categorized it as a primary commercial service airport. Federal Aviation Administration records say the airport had 262,846 passenger boardings (enplanements) in calendar year 2008, 243,448 in 2009 and 274,677 in 2010.

The 2013 Federal sequester would have resulted in the closure of the airport's control tower, but the Federal Aviation Administration ultimately reversed its decision.

History

The airport dates to the spring of 1927, when farmer Herman Will opened a 70-plus-acre tract in rural Normal Township. Bordering the field to the west was the recently paved Illinois 2 (today U.S. 51/Main Street), and to the east was the Illinois Central Railroad (today Constitution Trail). Along the IC, at the northeast corner of the airport grounds, was Kerrick, a busy grain elevator station that remains a local landmark. The Bloomington Flying Club helped rally the general public and local leaders behind the economic promise of "heavier-than-air" flight. The club owned a "Jenny"-type open-cockpit biplane, and the non-profit organization evidently helped pay for both the construction of a hangar and day-to-day operations of the field. Will offered to rent the field to the city of Bloomington for $1,000 a year, but there was little enthusiasm for a municipally owned or operated airport. In 1928, the Normal field featured a six-plane hangar, fueling pump, wind cone, a circle of crushed stone 100-feet in diameter (the purpose of which was to identify the field from the air), and 75 acres of "comparatively level ground."

The airport dedication was held on May 30, 1928, and witnessed by some 10,000 area residents. Local and visiting pilots staged an air show of "stunts and jumps and aerial tricks," according to The Pantagraph. There was "premier" stunt pilot Steve Lacey, representing the Air King factory in Lomax, Illinois, and Bloomington-raised escape artist Nathan B. Winslow, who thrilled spectators by freeing himself from a straight jacket during flight. A few weeks after the dedication, the U.S. Department of Commerce placed the Normal field on its list of officially recognized airports.

The following summer, on July 11, 1929, a larger crowd, estimated at 15,000, gathered at the airfield for the Central Illinois Air Derby. Billed at the time as the greatest such event in Illinois outside of Chicago, the show included four U.S. Army "ships" from Chanute Field in Rantoul, civilian aviators from places like Aurora, Champaign, Joliet and Kankakee, aerial "stunting" contests and races, parachutists and an air parade over downtown Bloomington.

Despite the efforts of local aviation enthusiasts and the business community, attempts to establish long-term passenger service at the Normal field ended in failure. In the fall of 1931, Century Air Lines added Bloomington to its Chicago-to-St. Louis route, and the little grassy square (recently enlarged by 35 acres) now served as an aerial portal to the wider world. Unfortunately the wet winter of 1931-1932 made the field too mushy for the carrier's Stinson tri-motor airplanes. The following spring, American Airways assumed Century's role, but after only two days (May 1–2) the company terminated service to the little airfield, and once more Bloomington lost its place on the air map.

Opposition to a municipally operated airport weakened with the promise of federal dollars through the Civil Works Administration, one of President Franklin D. Roosevelt's many "alphabet" New Deal programs. In mid-December 1933, during the height of the Great Depression, local officials settled on a 164-acre site east of Bloomington along Illinois 9. The new airfield (since renamed the Central Illinois Regional Airport—or CIRA for short) was dedicated in late October 1934.

Nothing survives of the old airport, but a historic marker near the north end of Constitution Trail commemorates the site. The marker is on the trail's west side, opposite the Kerrick elevators. Much of the airport grounds are now occupied by the unfinished warehouse of shuttered local manufacturer Wildwood Industries.

Facilities & Aircraft
The airport covers 1,968 acres (796 ha) at an elevation of 871 feet (265 m). It has two runways: runway 2/20 is 8,000 by 150 feet (2,438 x 46 m) concrete and runway 11/29 is 6,525 by 150 feet (1,989 x 46 m) asphalt/concrete.

On November 5, 2001, the airport opened a new $14 million terminal building, three times larger than the previous terminal. The new terminal has four ground level boarding gates (Gates 1–4) and five second level gates (Gates 5–9). Gates 3, 4, 5, 6, 8, and 9 have jetways. Gates 1, 2 and 7 are jetway capable but are not currently equipped. The terminal has two baggage carousels at ground level. Conference rooms and a VIP lounge cater to business travelers. Free wireless Internet access is available throughout the building.

CIRA has a healthy general aviation presence. The fixed-base operator on the field, Synergy Flight Center, offers standard FBO services, as well as private and advanced flight training, aircraft maintenance, sales, management and charter. Hangar rental, fueling, and aircraft maintenance facilities are available.

The Prairie Aviation Museum is on the west side of the airport. It is open to the public on Tuesday evenings and all day on Saturdays and Sundays. It exhibits more modern ex-USAF and US Navy aircraft.

For the 12-month period ending December 31, 2021, the airport had 23,360 aircraft movements, an average of 64 per day. It included 73% general aviation, 18% commercial, 8% air taxi, and 2% commercial. For the same time period, there are 74 aircraft based on the field: 58 single-engine and 4 multi-engine airplanes, 11 jets, and 1 helicopter.

Airlines and destinations

Passenger

Top destinations

Accidents and incidents 
On November 9, 2005, a Piper PA-23 was substantially damaged during a nighttime visual approach to runway 29. The aircraft had departed from Greater Peoria Regional Airport and was attempting to return due to a rough-running right engine, but he diverted to Bloomington instead. The pilot received fatal injuries. The probable cause was found to be pilot impairment due to diabetes.
On July 3, 2009, a Cessna 150 crashed while attempting a forced landing at the airport. The engine suddenly quit while the aircraft was on approach to make a forced landing. The pilot reported the plane stalled while approaching a road, and while he attempted to lower the nose and dump flaps, the left wing impacted a tree and the aircraft impacted the ground.
On August 30, 2010, a Diamond Aircraft DA20 sustained substantial damage during landing in Bloomington. The pilot reported he stalled the plane 10 feet above the ground, and the aircraft's right wing tip contacted the ground. The airplane existed the runway and the left wingtip impacted the ground. The pilot added power to go around and landed successfully on the second attempt. The probable cause was found to be the pilot's failure to maintain adequate airspeed during landing, which resulted in a stall.
On April 7, 2015, a Cessna 414A, registration number N789UP, substantially wandered from the correct flight path during an instrument approach to Runway 20 in low visibility and struck terrain in a nose-down attitude, killing the pilot and all six passengers. Investigators found that the glideslope antenna cable had not been securely connected, which rendered some of the avionics useless, increasing the workload for the pilot. Investigators also concluded that the pilot had been awake for 18 consecutive hours before the accident and that the aircraft was loaded with the center of gravity too far aft, rendering it difficult to control. The accident was attributed to "the pilot's failure to maintain control of the airplane during the instrument approach in night instrument meteorological conditions, which resulted in the airplane exceeding its critical angle of attack and an aerodynamic stall/spin. Contributing to the accident were pilot fatigue, the pilot's increased workload during the instrument approach resulting from the lack of glideslope guidance due to an inadequately connected/secured glideslope antenna cable, and the airplane being loaded aft of its balance limit."

See also
 
 
 List of airports in Illinois

References

External links
 Central Illinois Regional Airport at Bloomington-Normal, official website
Bloomington airport born of FDR's New Deal - Pantagraph (Bloomington, Illinois newspaper)
 Aerial image as of March 1999 from USGS The National Map
 
 

Airports in Illinois
Transportation buildings and structures in McLean County, Illinois